The London Nocturne (formerly the Smithfield Nocturne) was a cycling race in London, United Kingdom, organised as a criterium around a  long course in the City of London. It was first run in 2007 for men and in 2009 for women, and took place as part of a celebration of cycling during the afternoon and evening, such as those involving penny farthings and folding bicycles. Despite not being on the UCI Europe Tour, the race nonetheless attracted some high-profile names, such as Ed Clancy, Mark Cavendish, Matthew Goss, Davide Appollonio, Magnus Bäckstedt, and Sarah Storey.

Past winners

Men

Women

References

Cycle races in England
Recurring sporting events established in 2007
2007 establishments in England
Recurring sporting events disestablished in 2018
2018 disestablishments in England